James L. Barone (born May 20, 1941) is a former Democratic member of the Kansas Senate, representing the 13th District.

Barone was originally elected to the Senate in the 1996 elections. He was one of two Democratic Senators to get campaign contributions from the Koch brothers. He was accused of sexual harassment of young interns and multiple abuses of power, removed from positions of leadership by his minority caucus, and defeated in the 2008 primary.

References

External links

Vote Smart James Barone

Democratic Party Kansas state senators
1941 births
Living people
People from Frontenac, Kansas
20th-century American politicians
21st-century American politicians
Pittsburg State University alumni